Marcucci is an Italian surname. Notable people with the surname include:
Antonio Marcucci (born 1937), Italian Olympic wrestler
 Bob Marcucci (1930–2011), American personal manager at Chancellor Records and Robert P. Marcucci Productions
Domingo Marcucci (1827–1905), Venezuelan-born American shipbuilder 
Venerable Francesco Antonio Marcucci (1717-1798), Italian bishop 
 Gian Marco Marcucci (born 1954), served as a Captain Regent of San Marino